The First Lady of the Republic of China refers to the wife of the President of the Republic of China. Since 1949, the position has been based in Taiwan, where they are often called by the title of First Lady of Taiwan, in addition to First Lady of the Republic of China (ROC).

The position has been vacant since 2016, as incumbent President Tsai Ing-wen, the first woman to be elected to the presidency, is unmarried.

First Ladies (before the 1947 Constitution)

First Ladies (after the 1947 Constitution; based in Taiwan after 1949) 
Since 1949, individuals in this position have been known as the First Lady of Taiwan, in addition to the First Lady of the Republic of China.

Longevity

See also
 List of presidents of the Republic of China
 First family of the Republic of China

References

 
Spouses of Presidents of the Republic of China
Republic of China